The Sawtooth Range is a mountain range in eastern San Bernardino County, California.

They are in the Mojave Desert east of Lanfair Valley near the Colorado River and Nevada border.

References 

Mountain ranges of the Mojave Desert
Mountain ranges of San Bernardino County, California